Sari Ojaq (also Romanized as Sārī Ojāq; also known as Sheykh ʿAskar) is a village in Avajiq-e Shomali Rural District, Dashtaki District, Chaldoran County, West Azerbaijan Province, Iran. At the 2006 census, its population was 418, in 83 families.

References 

Populated places in Chaldoran County